Independent radio indicates a radio station that is run in a manner different from usual for the country it broadcasts in. In countries where there exist government-run radio stations that served as the primary or only the variety of licensed broadcaster, the term independent radio generally means commercial radio stations which are not operated by the government, and thus independent of the government.

Conversely, in places such as the United States, where commercial broadcasters are the norm, independent radio is sometimes used to refer to non-commercial educational radio stations that are primarily supported by listener contributions and are thus independent of commercial advertising concerns.  With the advent of large commercial broadcast radio network companies, and the general adoption of the term public radio in the United States to refer to non-religious radio-oriented listener-supported stations, the term has also been used to refer to commercial radio stations that are run independently of the large radio conglomerates.

See also
 Independent Local Radio
 Internet radio

References

Radio broadcasting